Haemateulia barrigana is a species of moth of the family Tortricidae. It is found in Chile (Curico Province and Nuble Province), and Argentina (Neuquén and Lucar).

Adults are variable in forewing maculation. One form is very similar to Haemateulia haematitis, with a dark forewing with limited pattern elements. Another form has a forewing pattern that includes a pale red-brown basal patch, followed by a region of pale scaling. Adults have been recorded on wing in February and March.

References

External links

Moths described in 2003
Tortricidae of South America
Euliini
Taxa named by Józef Razowski